Sergio Javier Vittor (born 9 July 1989) is an Argentine football defender who currently plays for Qatari club Al-Sailiya.

References

External links
 
 

1989 births
Living people
Sportspeople from Buenos Aires Province
Argentine footballers
Argentine expatriate footballers
Association football midfielders
Club Atlético Independiente footballers
Club de Gimnasia y Esgrima La Plata footballers
Atlético de Rafaela footballers
Universidad de Concepción footballers
Universidad de Chile footballers
MŠK Žilina players
Club Atlético Banfield footballers
Damac FC players
Al-Sailiya SC players
Slovak Super Liga players
Chilean Primera División players
Argentine Primera División players
Primera Nacional players
Saudi Professional League players
Qatar Stars League players
Expatriate footballers in Chile
Expatriate footballers in Slovakia
Expatriate footballers in Saudi Arabia
Expatriate footballers in Qatar
Argentine expatriate sportspeople in Chile
Argentine expatriate sportspeople in Slovakia
Argentine expatriate sportspeople in Saudi Arabia
Argentine expatriate sportspeople in Qatar